Kommissar X – In den Klauen des goldenen Drachen (In the Claws of the Golden Dragon) (English title:So Darling So Deadly) is a 1966 Eurospy film co-written and directed by Gianfranco Parolini and starring Tony Kendall and Brad Harris. It is the third of seven films, loosely based on the Kommissar X detective novels from the Pabel Moewig publishing house.

Plot

Professor Akron is an inventor based in Singapore who creates the Eradicon; a jewel like filter for a laser weapon that dramatically improves its power and range as well as the ability to stop engines over long distances.  Akron is given three days to accept a "blank cheque" from a criminal mastermind known as the Golden Dragon, but he contacts Interpol who arrange to send New York private detective Joe Walker and New York Police Captain Tom Rowland to Singapore to protect the professor, his attractive daughter and the Eradicon.

Cast 

 Tony Kendall as Joe Walker, aka Kommissar X 
 Brad Harris as  Captain Tom Rowland
 Barbara Frey as Sybille Akron
 Luisa Rivelli as Shabana
 Ernst Fritz Fürbringer as Professor Akron 
 Gisela Hahn as Stella
 Margaret Rose Keil as Selena
 Jacques Bézard as Charly
 Giuseppe Matte as Benny 
 Carlo Tamberlani as Jonathan Taylor
 Nikola Popovic as Li Hu Wang
 H. Amin as Takato
 Gianfranco Parolini as Rex (as Frank Littleword)

References

External links

1966 films
1960s action films
Italian spy action films
German spy action films
West German films
1960s Italian-language films
1960s German-language films
Films directed by Gianfranco Parolini
1960s buddy films
Films set in Singapore
Films shot in Singapore
Films based on German novels
1960s spy thriller films
1960s martial arts films
1960s multilingual films
German multilingual films
Italian multilingual films
1960s Italian films
1960s German films